The Boston Yanks were a National Football League team based in Boston, Massachusetts, that played from 1944 to 1948. The team played its home games at Fenway Park. Any games that conflicted with the Boston Red Sox baseball schedule in the American League were held at Braves Field of the cross-town National League team, the Boston Braves. Team owner Ted Collins, who managed singer and television show host Kate Smith (1907–1986) for thirty years, picked the name Yanks because he originally wanted to run a team that played at New York City's old Yankee Stadium. The Yanks could manage only a 2–8 record during their first regular season.

Because of a shortage of players caused by World War II, the Yanks were temporarily merged with the erratic founding APFA member Dayton Triangles' franchise, then known as the Brooklyn Tigers, for the 1945 season, and styled as just the Yanks with no home city named. The merged team played four home games in Boston and one in New York and finished with a 3–6–1 record.

When Brooklyn Tigers owner Dan Topping announced his intention to join the newly established rival professional football league, the All-America Football Conference (AAFC), in 1946, his NFL franchise, which was a founding APFA member that he had moved from Dayton, Ohio in 1929, was revoked and all of its players were assigned to the Yanks, with the original Triangles legacy being carried on by this group. After three continuous losing seasons, Collins finally was allowed to move to New York City. But instead of an official relocation, he asked the league to officially fold his Boston franchise and give him a new franchise, for a Federal tax write-off. The League granted his request, and Collins named his new team the New York Bulldogs. However, like many of this franchise's moves, the NFL considers them to have folded, while the players and assets simply moved, ultimately keeping the Dayton Triangles' legacy alive as the last remaining Ohio League member.
Despite the franchise's assets moving to a new city and carrying on the team's legacy, the Boston Yanks are the only officially defunct NFL team ever to have the first overall NFL draft pick. They had it twice, in 1944 and 1946, selecting quarterbacks from Notre Dame, Angelo Bertelli and Frank Dancewicz, both Massachusetts natives.

First round draft selections

Pro Football Hall of Fame

Season-by-season

References

 
Defunct National Football League teams
1944 establishments in Massachusetts
1948 disestablishments in Massachusetts
American football teams established in 1944
American football teams disestablished in 1948
American football teams in Boston